The Edgewell Personal Care Company is an American multinational consumer products company headquartered in Shelton, Connecticut. It was formed in 2015 following the corporate spin-off from Energizer Holdings. Edgewell Personal Care was formed by the renaming of the original Energizer Holdings; Energizer's battery business was then spun-off as Energizer Household Products and then renamed Energizer Holdings.

The company owns a number of brands, including Schick, Wilkinson Sword, Playtex, Carefree, Stayfree, Hawaiian Tropic, Banana Boat, Edge, and Billie.

History 
In February 2015, Energizer Holdings announced that it would split into two companies. The original entity, Energizer Holdings, Inc, would be converted to a personal care company and renamed Edgewell Personal Care. The household products and assets would be transferred to a new entity, Energizer SpinCo, Inc, that would then be renamed to (new) Energizer Holdings, Inc. David Hatfield, who was president and CEO of Energizer Personal Care at the time was named CEO of the Edgewell brand.

In January 2018, Edgewell announced it had entered an agreement to acquire luxury men's skincare brand Jack Black for an undisclosed sum. The deal closed in March 2018.

In May 2019, Edgewell announced it would purchase the razor company Harry's, including their female-focused Flamingo brand, for $1.37 billion. In October 2019, Edgewell announced that they were selling their diaper and cat litter disposal businesses to Le Holding Angelcare Inc. for $122.5 million.

The FTC announced on February 3, 2020 that it would seek to block Edgewell from purchasing the startup razor company Harry's on concerns of price manipulation. Edgewell announced on February 10, 2020 that it is terminating its merger agreement with Harry's after the FTC sued to block the $1.37 billion deal.

In November 2021, Edgewell announced it had acquired women's body brand Billie in an all-cash transaction at a purchase price $310 million.

Brands

References

External links
 

 
Personal care companies
American companies established in 2015
Manufacturing companies established in 2015
Companies listed on the New York Stock Exchange
Corporate spin-offs
Shelton, Connecticut
Manufacturing companies based in Connecticut
Companies based in Fairfield County, Connecticut
2015 establishments in Connecticut